Pterolophia lumawigiensis is a species of beetle in the family Cerambycidae. It was described by Stephan von Breuning in 1980. It is distributed mainly in the Philippines.

References

lumawigiensis
Beetles described in 1980